Luke Prokop (born May 6, 2002) is a Canadian professional ice hockey defenceman for the Seattle Thunderbirds of the Western Hockey League as a prospect for the Nashville Predators of the National Hockey League (NHL), who selected him in the 2020 NHL Entry Draft. In 2021, Prokop came out as gay, becoming the first player under contract with an NHL team to do so.

Playing career
Prokop is from Edmonton, Alberta. He became a fan of Shea Weber, a right-handed defenceman, when he watched Weber playing ice hockey at the 2010 Winter Olympics for the Canadian men's national ice hockey team. Prokop became a fan of Weber's team, the Nashville Predators of the National Hockey League (NHL), and began wearing jersey number 6 in his honour.

Prokop attended the Pursuit of Excellence Hockey Academy in Kelowna, British Columbia. The Calgary Hitmen of the Western Hockey League (WHL) selected Prokop with their first round selection, the seventh overall, of the 2017 WHL Bantam Draft. He played for Canada's national under-18 ice hockey team in the 2018 IIHF World U18 Championships.

The Predators selected Prokop in the third round, with the 73rd overall selection, of the 2020 NHL Entry Draft. In December 2020, he signed a three-year entry-level contract with the Predators, and spent the 2020–21 season with Calgary.

The Hitmen traded Prokop to the Edmonton Oil Kings on October 13, 2021. He opened the 2022-23 season with the Norfolk Admirals of the East Coast Hockey League. On October 25, 2022, the Seattle Thunderbirds traded three conditional WHL draft picks to Edmonton for Prokop.

Personal life 
Luke's older brother, Josh, is also an ice hockey player. The Calgary Hitmen signed Josh in September 2018. They both spent time playing with Calgary, before Luke was traded to the Edmonton Oil Kings.

On July 19, 2021, Prokop came out as gay, becoming the first player under contract with an NHL team to do so.

Career statistics

Regular season and playoffs

International

References

External links

2002 births
Living people
Calgary Hitmen players
Canadian ice hockey defencemen
Edmonton Oil Kings players
Gay sportsmen
Canadian LGBT sportspeople
LGBT ice hockey players
Nashville Predators draft picks
Norfolk Admirals (ECHL) players
Seattle Thunderbirds players
Ice hockey people from Edmonton
Canadian gay men